Mount Rosary Church is a Roman Catholic church situated in Kallianpur, a suburb of Udupi City in the Udupi district of India. The church came into existence in 1837 at the time of the Goan schism when some Catholic families withdrew from their parish Milagres Cathedral and acknowledged the jurisdiction of the Vicar Apostolic of Verapoly. They built a church only a few yards away from Milagres Cathedral. Since then it has undergone alterations and additions. It is strategically located close to the NH 66.

History
In 1880, Fr Albert D’Souza (1879–1890) decided to build a new church, and the location was shifted to Nejar Hill. The foundation stone of the new church was blessed by the Bishop of Mangalore, the Most Rev. Pagani, on 26 November 1880. Due to paucity of funds, Fr Albert D’Souza could not complete the church. At this juncture, Mattheus Rebello, hereditary Patel of Kallianpurl, pledged his property, took a loan and completed the church building. The first mass was in the newly constructed tiled roof church building was offered on 14 May 1882. On 9 January 1883, the statue of the Holy Rosary was installed in the church. The church also received some land from the Patel, Ignatius Fernandes.
 
The expansion of the church was done at gradual stages. Fr J.M. Masse (1890–1916) built the presbytery in 1895, and Fr John Salvadore Mathais constructed the portico. Fr Piedade Saldanha (1931–1938) built a shrine to commemorate the centenary of the church in 1937. Fr Rosario Denis Sequeira (1957–1967) built the grotto.
 
The sesqui-centennial (1837–1987) celebrations were held in 1987 during the time of Fr Victor Saldanha. The cost of construction of the new belfry was donated in memory of late Louis and Leticia Rebello by their family members. The newly erected belfry was inaugurated on January 30, 1999. Fr Godfrey Saldanha completed the church hall, which was inaugurated on January 4, 2001, by Most Rev Dr Leo Cornelio of Khandwa diocese, who is presently the Archbishop of Bhopal.
 
Realizing the need to spread education among the girls, a primary school for them was started in 1925, and it was handed over to the Carmelite Sisters in 1933. On June 1, 1958, Lourdes Hospital built by Msgr R Denis Sequeira was inaugurated, which was handed over to the Sisters of the Queen of the Apostles in 1962.
 
Realizing the importance of English education following the liberalization and globalization policy of the government, Fr Godfrey Linus Aurelius Saldanha began Mount Rosary English Medium School in 1997. The new school building was inaugurated on June 1, 1999.
 
Mount Rosary Church completed 175 years of existence in 2012. To mark the event and provide sufficient space to the ever-increasing parishioners, Parish Priest Fr. Philip Neri Aranha, who had taken charge of the parish since 2010, in consultation with the Parish Pastoral Council and the parishioners in general decided to rebuild the church.
 
To raise the new church, a prominent site where the previous Mount Rosary church existed was selected. The foundation stone was blessed by the Bishop of the Mangalore Diocese, the Most Rev. Dr. Aloysius Paul D’Souza, during the Mass that was held at the Millennium auditorium on March 3, 2012, and the laid at the site in the presence of a large number of parishioners, including Jerry Vincent Dias, vice president of the Parish Pastoral Council; Secretary Richard Dias; and former vice presidents Stany Cornelio, Prof Ligory Aranha and Benedict Menezes.
 
The construction work of the church went on for two years and nine months. As a result of meticulous planning and sustained work ably supervised by Fr. Philip Neri Aranha and supported by Jerry Vincent Dias, Richard Dias and others the work of the new church was completed to the delight of all the parishioners.

Present structure
The new building of the 178-year-old Mount Rosary Church was inaugurated on Tuesday, January 6, 2015. The church was inaugurated by Jerry Vincent Dais and Molly Dias, vice president of parish pastoral council. The inauguration Mass was celebrated by Rt. Rev. Dr. Aloysius Paul D'souza (Bishop of the Mangalore Diocese). Thousands of devotees witnessed the grand inauguration and blessing of the newly built church.

With an imposing structure and elegant exterior, the church is spacious enough to comfortably accommodate 1200 faithful. The church is 115 feet long, 76 feet wide and 60 feet high. The chief attraction of the church is the high altar, which has been superbly executed by renowned artists and architects from Korathi, Kerala. They have carved a beautiful altar with great care and dedication. The church has an adoration chapel which is fully air-conditioned. The wooden cross on the high altar, the tinted glass windows depicting different episodes from the Bible, the mosaic style Way of the Cross, the beautiful statues of saints and above all, the statue of Our Lady of Mount Rosary are the chief attractions of the church.

Architecture
The altar of the church was designed by the Artistes and architects from Korathi in Kerala. The wooden cross on the high altar, the tinted glass windows which depict vivid incidents from the Bible, the Way of the Cross in Mosaic style, the statues of saints, the statue of Our Lady of Mount Rosary are the primary attraction of the church. The church has an adoration chapel which is air-conditioned.

External links
Official Church website

Churches in Mangalore Diocese
Roman Catholic churches in Karnataka
Churches in Kallianpur